John Ellicott may refer to:

 John Ellicott (clockmaker) (1706–1772), English clock and watchmaker
 John Ellicott (miller) (1739–1794), American miller